
The Saguenay River is a major river of Quebec, Canada. 
It drains Lac Saint-Jean in the Laurentian Highlands, leaving at Alma and running east; the city of Saguenay is located on the river. It drains into the Saint Lawrence River. Tadoussac, founded as a French colonial trading post in 1600, is located on the northeast bank at this site.

The river has a very high flow-rate and is bordered by steep cliffs associated with the Saguenay Graben. Tide waters flow in its fjord upriver as far as Chicoutimi (about 100 kilometres). Many Beluga whales breed in the cold waters at its mouth, making Tadoussac a popular site for whale watching and sea kayaking; Greenland sharks also frequent the depths of the river. The area of the confluence of the Saguenay and Saint Lawrence is protected by the Saguenay–St. Lawrence Marine Park, one of Canada's national parks.

History 

The Saguenay River was used as an important trade route into the interior for the First Nations people of the area.  During the French colonization of the Americas, the river became a major route for the fur trade. The French established Tadoussac, France's first trading post in Canada, in 1600. They named the river for the legendary Kingdom of Saguenay. It is the namesake of Saguenay Herald at the Canadian Heraldic Authority.

Beginning in the 19th century, the river was exploited for transport and power by the logging and pulp and paper industries. A dam on the upper Saguenay generates hydroelectricity for local industries, such as aluminum smelting and paper mills.

Severe flooding of the Saguenay's tributary rivers from July 18 to 21, 1996, devastated the region in one of Canada's costliest natural disasters, the Saguenay Flood. Research has shown that the old sediments are no longer a threat to ecosystems.

Geography 
The Saguenay originates in Lac Saint-Jean at Alma. There are two channels: La Petite Décharge and La Grande Décharge, on which is built the dam Île Maligne hydroelectric plant. The island formed by these two rivers is part of the municipality of Alma. At this place, the water is freshwater. Three bridges cross the "Petite Décharge" and two others cross the "Grande Décharge". It is when these two rivers meet just east of Alma that the Saguenay really begins. It begins in the form of a reservoir several kilometers long, unlike the rapids and powerful falls that dotted the river before the erection of dams.

At Shipshaw, Quebec, the Saguenay splits again in two. On the northern watercourse, there is the Shipshaw hydroelectric station and, on the south side, the Chute-à-Caron power plant. It is here that the Aluminum Bridge is located.

Between Chicoutimi and Jonquière, the two  come together to form the Saguenay. It becomes accessible to navigation at this point. Moreover, Chicoutimi means "how deep is it"  in Innu-aimun. At Tadoussac, a ferry provides the link between Tadoussac and Baie-Sainte-Catherine.

Tributaries

Riverside municipalities

See also
 List of longest rivers of Canada
 List of Quebec rivers
 List of National Parks of Canada

Notes

External links

 "Saguenay River", The Canadian Encyclopedia
 Canadian Council for Geographic Education page with a series of articles on the history of the Saguenay River.

Geography of Saguenay, Quebec
Tributaries of the Saint Lawrence River
Rivers of Saguenay–Lac-Saint-Jean
Fjords of Canada